The 2009–10 Oregon State Beavers men's basketball team represented Oregon State University in the 2009-10 college basketball season. Their head coach was Craig Robinson who was in his 2nd year. The team played their home games at Gill Coliseum in Corvallis, Oregon and are members of the Pacific-10 Conference. They finished the season 14–18, 8–10 in Pac-10 play and lost in the quarterfinals of the 2010 Pacific-10 Conference men's basketball tournament. Despite a sub .500 record, the Beavers were invited to the 2010 College Basketball Invitational where they lost in the first round.

2009 recruiting class

Roster

Schedule 

|-
!colspan=9 style=| Exhibition

|-
!colspan=9 style=| Regular season

|-
!colspan=9 style=| Pac-10 tournament

|-
!colspan=9 style=| CBI

Highlights
 December 6, 2009 – After winning just one of their first four games, the Beavers won their next three games in a row.
 Sweeps of archrival Oregon, 2009 Pac-10 Tournament Champion USC, and perennial power Arizona.
 February 13, 2010 - First win at Arizona (McKale Center, Tucson) in 27 years
 Seth Tarver was awarded Pac-10 Defensive Player of the Year
 Calvin Haynes was named to the All-Pac-10 Second Team

References

Oregon State Beavers men's basketball seasons
Oregon State
Oregon State
Oregon State
Oregon State